Great British Chefs is British-based food website that contains a collection of recipes, as well as instructional guides, videos, features on British food, and profiles of chefs and restaurants in the UK.

Apps 

The first Great British Chefs iOS app was released in July 2011 and featured 12 chefs, who each provided 5 recipes. The app was included in the Sunday Times' top 500 apps list, won a silver Lovie Award for Best Tablet App and was also featured in Apps Magazine's Top 100 Apps Ever.

The second Great British Chefs app, 'Feastive', was released in November 2011.
 
Great British Chefs' third app, 'Summertime', was produced in partnership with the online supermarket Ocado with a shopping list feature to purchase ingredients. The apps also have the ability to share recipes on social networking services. A portion of the revenue from the sale of the Summertime app went to the charity Action Against Hunger.

There was also an app for Windows 8

Reception 
Reviews of the iOS apps were positive with The Telegraph praising the low price of compared to traditional cookbooks and the "superb photography [which] makes it equally lovely to look at". Technology website Pocket-Lint praised the navigation of the app and listed it as "app of the day" on July 27, 2011.

References

External links 
 Official site

British cooking websites
IOS software